Öznur Polat (born December 12, 1987) is a Turkish curler and curling coach. She currently plays third on the Turkish National Women's Curling Team skipped by Dilşat Yıldız.

Career
Polat was admitted to the Turkish women's national team in 2010, while still in juniors. At the junior level, she skipped the Turkish team to a winless 0–9 record at the 2011 Winter Universiade. She fared well in the European C Division from 2010 to 2012, qualifying Turkey into the B Division in both 2010 and 2012. She took over as skip of the team from 2013 to 2015, before Dilşat Yıldız took over skipping duties for the team, moving Polat to third.

After losing in a tiebreaker in both 2014 and 2015, the Turkish women's team qualified for the playoffs in the B Division at the 2016 European Curling Championships, finishing second in the round robin with a 7–2 record. The team then defeated Estonia 10–2 in the semifinal before dropping the final 6–5 to Hungary. Despite the loss, the top two finish earned Turkey a spot in the A Division for the 2017 championship, the first time the country ever qualified to compete in the highest level. At the 2017 European Curling Championships, the Turkish squad finished in ninth with a 2–7 record, relegating Turkey back into the B Division for 2018. One of their victories, however, came against the world silver medalists team of Anna Sidorova from Russia.

Back in the B Division at the 2018 European Curling Championships, Turkey again finished in second through the round robin with a 7–2 record. They then lost to Estonia 7–3 in the semifinal before defeating Lithuania 6–5 to earn the bronze medal. This wasn't enough, however, to advance her team into the 2019 A Division. For the first time in their careers, Team Turkey topped the round robin at the 2019 European Curling Championships again with a 7–2 record. This earned them the top seed in the playoff round, where they easily defeated England 9–4 in the semifinal. This advanced the Turkish side to the final, which they would drop 5–2 to Italy's Veronica Zappone. Despite the loss, their top two finish not only earned them a berth in the A Division for 2021, but also a spot at the 2020 World Qualification Event for a chance to qualify for the 2020 World Women's Curling Championship. At the event, Yıldız led Turkey to a 4–3 round robin record, enough to earn the third playoff spot. They then faced Italy for the final berth in the World Championship. Again, however, the Italians got the best of Team Turkey, defeating them 8–4 and earning the last spot at the Women's Worlds. The Turkish team did not compete in any international events during the 2020–21 season due to the cancellation of all events because of the COVID-19 pandemic.

The 2021–22 season was a breakout season for Turkish curling, as the nation found relative successful in the international events they attended. At the start of the season, Erzurum hosted the 2021 Pre-Olympic Qualification Event to qualify teams for the 2021 Olympic Qualification Event. In the women's event, the Turkish team succeeded in qualifying for the Olympic Qualification Event, going 5–1 through the round robin and knockout round. Their next event was the 2021 European Curling Championships, where Turkey competed in the A Division. Through the event, Turkey posted three victories against Denmark, Estonia and Italy, enough to finish in seventh place in the group. This seventh-place finish was enough to earn them a direct spot into the 2022 World Women's Curling Championship, the first time Turkey ever qualified for a men's or women's world championship. Next was the Olympic Qualification Event, held December 5 to 18 in Leeuwarden, Netherlands. Polat, with Yıldız, Berfin Şengül, Ayşe Gözütok and Mihriban Polat, finished 3–5 through the round robin. Their three victories, however, came against the top three teams in the event. The team defeated the eventual Olympic gold and silver medalists Eve Muirhead and Satsuki Fujisawa, as well as the silver medalists from 2018 in Korea's Kim Eun-jung. Into the new year, Polat and the women's team represented Turkey at the World Championship. After losing multiple close games in extra ends, the Turkish team was able to record their first victory in World Women's Championship history against Czech Republic's Alžběta Baudyšová 7–5 in Draw 17 of the event. The team ultimately finished the event in eleventh place with a 2–10 record, recording their second victory against the Scottish team who had to withdraw before the event began.

In 2015, Polat represented Turkey at the 2015 World Mixed Doubles Curling Championship with partner Kadir Çakır. After splitting their opening six games with three wins and three losses, the pair lost their final three round robin games. This placed them eighth in their pool with a 3–6 record, and twenty-second overall in the thirty team event. She has also competed in three World Mixed Curling Championship's in 2016, 2018 and 2019. Her best finish at the event came in 2018, where she skipped the Turkish team of Bilal Ömer Çakır, Oğuzhan Karakurt and Semiha Konuksever to a 6–2 round robin record, enough to qualify for the playoff round. They then stole a victory against Denmark in the qualification game before dropping the semifinal to Russia, the eventual bronze medalists from the event.

Personal life
Polat is employed as a teacher. She attended Atatürk University.

Teams

Women's

Mixed

Mixed doubles

Record as a coach of national teams

References

External links

Living people
1987 births
Turkish female curlers
Atatürk University alumni
Competitors at the 2011 Winter Universiade
Turkish curling coaches
Sportspeople from Erzurum
Turkish educators
21st-century Turkish sportswomen